San Ildefonso Sola is a town and municipality in Oaxaca in south-western Mexico. The municipality covers an area of 52.32 km². 
It is part of the Sola de Vega District in the Sierra Sur Region.

As of 2005, the municipality had a total population of 789.

References

Municipalities of Oaxaca